Arunachala Arts and Science for Women is a women's arts college in Kanyakumari district. It is located at Mangavilai, Nagercoil. It also is part of the Khelo India initiative of government of India providing facilities for athletics, badminton, basketball, football, kabaddi and volleyball.

Courses offered 

 B.Sc. Computer Science
 B.Sc. Mathematics
 B.Sc. Fashion Technology
 B.Sc. Nutrition & Dietetics
 B.A English
 B.Com. Bachelor of Commerce
 B.C.A Bachelor of Computer Applications
 BBA Bachelor of Business Administration
 B.Sc Artificial Intelligence

References 

Women's engineering colleges in India
Private engineering colleges in Tamil Nadu
Colleges affiliated to Anna University
Universities and colleges in Kanyakumari district